In algebraic geometry, a Steinerian of a hypersurface, introduced by ,  is the locus of the singular points of its polar quadrics.

References

Algebraic geometry